Gerhard Charles Rump (born 1947 in Bochum, Germany, † 2020 in Berlin, Germany) was an author on art history and the theory of contemporary art, emeritus art history teacher at the Technical University of Berlin, curator, gallerist and photo artist.

Biography and career 

Born in Bochum on February 24, 1947, he finished the Graf-Engelbert-Schule (Gymnasium) in 1967 and studied Art History, English Language and Literature, Philosophy, Pedagogics and Psychology at the Ruhr-Universität Bochum from 1968 to 1972; later also Anthropology at the Rheinische-Friedrich-Wilhelms-Universität in Bonn. He received his PhD with a book on the British 18th Century portrait painter George Romney in 1972. He became a curator at the University of Bochum’s University Library, in 1974 he went to Bonn University as Assistant Professor for Art History. In 1983 he left the University to become a freelance journalist for the national newspapers “Die Welt” and “Rheinischer Merkur” as well as a number of regional journals like “Kölnische Rundschau” and “Bonner Rundschau”. Concurrently he worked as an asset consultant for “Deutsche Vermögensberatung”. In 1986/7 he was curator of monuments for the city of Wesel (Germany), but joined the computer printer manufacturer Mannesmann Tally (now TallyDascom) in 1987 as corporate communications manager to become the company’s marketing director a few years later. In 1987 he had his Habilitation at the University of Duisburg. In 1994 he returned to journalism as art market editor for “Die Welt” while he pursued researching on art and art history and gained some renown as media theorist, particularly on art communication and semiotics. He also pursued his career as artist photographer. In 2009 he contributed to Konstantin Akinsha's article on Russian avant garde which won the Association for Women in Communications' "Clarion Award". In 2010 he finally left “Die Welt” in order to forcus on his activities as university teacher and essayist, as art journalist and curator. In 2011 Catrin Rothe, Bernhard Ailinger and Gerhard Charles Rump founded the now only virtual art project and producers’ "RAR Gallery" — Berlin, New York (NY) and Palo Alto (CA).

Publications (selected) 
Rump authored among other titles:

 Gerhard Charles Rump: Rekonstruktionen. Positionen zeitgenössischer Kunst. B&S Siebenhaar Verlag, Berlin 2010 
 Gerhard Charles Rump / Jürgen Raap: Stephan Kaluza: Abfolgen. Edition Vits, Düsseldorf 2005
 Gerhard Charles Rump: runningMARS. Kunstforum Niederrhein, Emmerich 2004 (Exhibition catalog)
 Gerhard Charles Rump / Natascha Plankermann: Kate Waters. Twentyfourseven. Galerie Voss, Düsseldorf 2003 (Exhibition catalog)
 Gerhard Charles Rump (a.o.): Mythos und Moderne. Edvard Frank, Leben und Werk. Eine Biographie mit Briefen. Rathaus Galerie, Euskirchen 1999
 Gerhard Charles Rump: London Yesterday, Gingko Press, Berkeley Ca, Kunstverlag Weingarten, Weingarten 1998
 Gerhard Charles Rump / Peter Weiermair: Günter Blum. Venus. Ed. Braus, Heidelberg 1997
 Gerhard Charles Rump: Kunstwissenschaft und Verhaltensforschung. Studien zu verhaltensbiologischen Motivationen in künstlerischen Darstellungen. Deparade Verlag, Soest 1993 
 Gerhard Charles Rump: Raimer Jochims / Gotthard Graubner. Inter Nationes (Fine Arts), Bonn 1986
 Gerhard Charles Rump: Vergangenheitsrechnen. (Folia Pataphysica, 4) CMZ-Verlag, Rheinbach-Merzbach 1986 
 Gerhard Charles Rump: How to Look at an Abstract Painting. Inter Nationes (Fine Arts), Bonn 1985
 Gerhard Charles Rump: Pferde und Jagdbilder in der englischen Kunst. Studien zu George Stubbs und dem Genre der "Sporting Art" von 1650-1830. Olms, Hildesheim, New York 1983 
 Gerhard Charles Rump (ed.): Gefängnis und Paradies: Momente in der Geschichte eines Motivs. Habelt, Bonn 1982
 Gerhard Charles Rump: Geschichte als Paradigma: Zur Reflexion des Historischen in der Kunst. Habelt, Bonn 1982
 Gerhard Charles Rump / Heindrichs, Wilfried (eds.): Interaktionsanalysen. Aspekte dialogischer Kommunikation. Gerstenberg, Hildesheim 1982 
 Gerhard Charles Rump: Kunstpsychologie. Kunst und Psychoanalyse. Kunstwissenschaft. Psychologische, Anthropologische, Semiotische Versuche zur Kunstwissenschaft. Olms, Hildesheim, New York 1981
 Gerhard Charles Rump (ed.): Carl Buchheister (1890-1964). Ausgewählte Schriften und Briefe. Gerstenberg, Hildesheim 1980 
 Gerhard Charles Rump / Wilfried Heindrichs (eds.): Dialoge. Beiträge zur Interaktions- und Diskursanalyse. Gerstenberg, Hildesheim 1979
 Gerhard Charles Rump (ed.): Kunst und Kunsttheorie des XVIII. Jahrhunderts in England. Studien zum Wandel ästhetischer Anschauungen 1650-1830. Gerstenberg, Hildesheim 1979
 Gerhard Charles Rump: Medium und Kunst. Olms, Hildesheim, New York, 1978 
 Gerhard Charles Rump: Bildstruktur - Erkenntnisstruktur: Gegenseitige Bedingungen von Kunst und Verhalten. A. Henn Verlag, Kastellaun 1978
 Gerhard Charles Rump: Friedrich Gräsel. In: Bildhauer heute, vol. 2. Gerstenberg, Hildesheim 1978
 Gerhard Charles Rump: George Romney (1734-1802). Zur Bildform der Bürgerlichen Mitte in der Englischen Neoklassik. 2 vols. Olms, Hildesheim, New York 1974 
 Gerhard Charles Rump (ed.): Sprachnetze. Studien zur literarischen Sprachverwendung. Mit Beiträgen zu Rainer Werner Fassbinder, Agatha Christie, André Breton und James Joyce. Olms, Hildesheim, New York 1976

References

External links 
 Department of History of Art of TU Berlin.
 Gerhard Charles Rump's Homepage
  The homepage of the gallery has been removed

1947 births
Art writers
Academic staff of the Technical University of Berlin
German art dealers
German art historians
German contemporary artists
German erotic photographers
Photographers from North Rhine-Westphalia
Living people
University of Bonn alumni
German male non-fiction writers
People from Bochum